Asociación Deportiva Huracán is a Spanish football team based in Las Palmas, in the Canary Islands. Founded in 1980 it plays in Regional Preferente, holding home games at Estadio Pepe Gonçalvez, with a capacity of 3,000 seats.

History
Huracán first reached the fourth division of Spanish football in 2002–03, being immediately relegated back. In late June 2011, before the start of what would be its eighth season in the category, the club gave up its berth, citing poor finances as the main reason; it subsequently returned to the regional championships.

Notable Huracán youth products include former Real Madrid winger Jesé and current Villarreal CF forward Yeremy Pino.

Season to season

7 seasons in Tercera División

References

External links
Official website 

Football clubs in the Canary Islands
Sport in Las Palmas
Association football clubs established in 1980
Divisiones Regionales de Fútbol clubs
1980 establishments in Spain